Camponotus laevigatus is a species of carpenter ant native to California. It nests in the dead branches of oaks such as Quercus wislizeni (interior live oak).

The more widespread ant formerly called C. laevigatus is now called Camponotus laevissimus. According to AntWiki, "most literature (probably except for the original description) as well as specimens in museums labelled as C. laevigatus actually refer to C. laevissimus."

References

laevigatus
Insects described in 1858
Fauna of California